The Fortress of Mimoyecques is the modern name for a Second World War underground military complex built by the forces of Nazi Germany between 1943 and 1944. It was constructed by a mostly German workforce recruited from major engineering and mining concerns, augmented by prisoner-of-war slave labour.

The complex consists of a network of tunnels dug under a chalk hill, linked to five inclined shafts in which 25 V-3 guns would have been installed, all targeted on London. The guns would have been able to fire ten dart-like explosive projectiles a minute – 600 rounds every hour – into the British capital, which Winston Churchill later commented would have constituted "the most devastating attack of all". The Allies knew nothing about the V-3 but identified the site as a possible launching base for V-2 ballistic missiles, based on reconnaissance photographs and fragmentary intelligence from French sources.

Mimoyecques was targeted for intensive bombardment by the Allied air forces from late 1943 onwards. Construction work was seriously disrupted, forcing the Germans to abandon work on part of the complex. The rest was partly destroyed on 6 July 1944 by No. 617 Squadron RAF, who used ground-penetrating  "Tallboy" earthquake bombs to collapse tunnels and shafts, entombing hundreds of slave workers underground.

The Germans halted construction work at Mimoyecques as the Allies advanced up the coast following the Normandy landings. It fell to the Canadian 3rd Infantry Division on 5 September 1944 without resistance, a few days after the Germans withdrew from the area.

The complex was partly demolished just after the war on Churchill's direct orders (and to the great annoyance of the French, who were not consulted), as it was still seen as a threat to the United Kingdom. It was later reopened by private owners, first in 1969 to serve as a mushroom farm and subsequently as a museum in 1984. A nature conservation organisation acquired the Fortress of Mimoyecques in 2010, and La Coupole (a museum near Saint-Omer housing a former V-2 rocket base) took over its management. It continues to be open to the public as a vast underground museum complex.

Background

In May 1943 Albert Speer, the Reich's Minister of Armaments and War Production, informed Adolf Hitler of work that was being carried out to produce a large-calibre gun capable of firing hundreds of shells an hour over long distances. The newly designed gun, codenamed the Hochdruckpumpe ("High Pressure Pump", HDP for short) and later designated as the V-3, was one of the V-weapons – Vergeltungswaffen ("retaliation or vengeance weapons") – developed by Nazi Germany in the later stages of the war to attack Allied targets.

Long-range guns were not a new development, but the high-pressure detonations used to fire shells from previous such weapons, including the Paris gun, rapidly wore out their barrels.

In 1942, August Coenders, inspired by previous designs of multi-chamber guns, suggested that the gradual acceleration of the shell by a series of small charges spread over the length of the barrel might be the solution to the problem of designing very long-range guns. Coenders proposed the use of electrically activated charges to eliminate the problem of the premature ignition of the subsidiary charges experienced by previous multi-chamber guns.

Each barrel would be  in diameter.

The gun was still in its prototype stages, but Hitler was an enthusiastic supporter of the idea and ordered that maximum support be given to its development and deployment. In August 1943 he approved the construction of a battery of HDP guns in France to supplement the planned V-1 and V-2 missile campaigns against London and the south-east of England. Speer noted afterwards:

A study carried out in early 1943 had shown that the optimal location for its deployment would be within a hill with a rock core into which inclined drifts could be tunneled to support the barrels.

The site was identified by a fortification expert, Major Bock of the Festungs-Pionier-Stab 27 of the Fifteenth Army LVII Corps based in the Dieppe area. It had been selected with care; the hill in which the facility was built is primarily chalk with very little topsoil cover, and the chalk layer extends several hundred metres below the surface, providing a deep but easily tunnelled rock layer. The chalk is easy to excavate and strong enough to dig tunnels without using timber supports. Although the site's road links were poor, it was only a few kilometres west of the main railway line between Calais and Boulogne-sur-Mer.

Design and construction
Construction began in September 1943 with the building of railway lines to support the work, and excavation of the gun shafts began in October. The smoothbore design of the HDP would enable a much higher rate of fire than was possible with conventional guns. The entire battery would be able to fire up to 10 shots a minute, capable in theory of hitting London with 600 projectiles every hour. The western site was abandoned at an early stage after being disrupted by Allied bombing, and only the eastern complex was built.

Owing to technical problems with the gun prototype, the scope of the project was reduced; drifts I and II were abandoned at an early date and only III, IV and V were taken forward. The openings in the slab were protected by large steel plates, and the railway tunnel entrances were further protected by armoured steel doors. Each drift was oriented on a bearing of 299°, to the nearest degree – a direct line on Westminster Bridge. Although the elevation and direction of the guns could not be changed, it would have been possible to alter the range by varying the amount of propellant used in each shot. This would have brought much of London within range.

Each gallery was fitted with a  gauge railway track. On the east side of the tunnel were chambers intended to be used as store rooms, offices and quarters for the garrison. Trains would have entered the facility and unloaded shells and propellant for the guns.

Galleries 6–10, the central group, gave access to the guns, while galleries 3–5 and 11–13 were intended for use as access tunnels and perhaps also storage areas. The 62 m workings were constructed to facilitate the removal of spoil from the drifts, while those at 47 m were connected with the handling of exhaust gases from the guns and those at 30 m gave access to the breeches of the guns. The lower levels of the workings were accessed via lift shafts, and mining cages were used during construction.

The construction work was carried out by over 5,000 workers, mostly German engineers drafted in from several companies including Mannesmann, Gute Hoffnungshütte, Krupp and the Vereinigte Stahlwerke, supplemented by 430 miners recruited from the Ruhr and Soviet prisoners of war who were used as slave labourers. The intensive Allied bombing campaign caused delays, but construction work continued nonetheless at a high pace underground. The original plans had envisaged having the first battery of five guns ready by March 1944 and the full complement of 25 guns by 1 October 1944, but these target dates were not met.

Air raids

Discovery and destruction

In 1943 French agents reported that the Germans were planning to mount an offensive against the United Kingdom that would involve the use of secret weapons resembling giant mortars sunk in the ground and served by rail links. The first signs of abnormal activity at Mimoyecques were spotted by analysts at the Allied Central Interpretation Unit in September 1943, when aerial reconnaissance revealed that the Germans were building railway loops leading to the tunnels into the eastern and western sites. Further reconnaissance flights in October 1943 photographed large-scale activity around the tunnels.

An analyst named André Kenny discovered a series of shafts when he saw from a reconnaissance photograph that a haystack concealing one of them had disintegrated, perhaps through the effects of a gale, revealing the entrance, a windlass and pulley. The purpose of the site was unclear, but it was thought to be some kind of shelter for launching rockets or flying bombs. An MI6 agent reported that "a concrete chamber was to be built near one of the tunnels for the installation of a tube, 40 to 50 metres long, which he referred to as a 'rocket launching cannon. The shafts were interpreted as "air holes to allow for the expansion of the gases released by the explosion of the launching charge."

The Allies were unaware of the HDP gun and therefore of the Mimoyecques site's true purpose. Allied intelligence believed at the time that the V-2 rocket had to be launched from tubes or "projectors", so it was assumed that the inclined shafts at Mimoyecques were intended to house such devices.

The lack of intelligence on Mimoyecques was frustrating for those involved in Crossbow operations to counter the V-weapons. On 21 March 1944 the British Chiefs of Staff discussed the shortage of intelligence but were told by Reginald Victor Jones, one of the "Crossbow Committee" members, that little information was leaking out because the workforce was predominantly German. The Committee's head, Duncan Sandys, pressed for greater efforts and proposed that the Special Operations Executive be tasked to kidnap a German technician who could be interrogated for information. The suggestion was approved, but was never put into effect.

In the end the Chiefs of Staff instructed General Eisenhower to begin intensive attacks on the so-called "Heavy Crossbow" sites, including Mimoyecques, which was still believed to be intended for use as a rocket-launching site.

The Allied air forces carried out several bombing raids on Mimoyecques between November 1943 and June 1944 but caused little damage. The bombing disrupted the construction project and the initial raids of 5 and 8 November 1943 caused work to be delayed for about a month. The Germans subsequently decided to abandon the western site, where work had not progressed very far, and concentrated on the eastern site. On 6 July 1944 the Royal Air Force began bombing the site with ground-penetrating Tallboy "earthquake" bombs. One Tallboy hit the concrete slab on top of Drift IV, collapsing the drift. Three others penetrated the tunnels below and substantially damaged the facility, causing several of the galleries to collapse in places.

Around 300 Germans and forced labourers were buried alive by the collapses. Adding to the Germans' difficulties, major technical problems were discovered with the HDP gun projectiles. This was not discovered until over 20,000 projectiles had already been manufactured.

After the devastating raid of 6 July, the Germans held a high-level meeting on the site's future at which Hitler ordered major changes to the site's development. On 12 July 1944 he signed an order instructing that only five HDP guns were to be installed in a single drift. A pair of Rheinbote missile launchers were to be installed at the tunnel entrances. These plans were soon abandoned as Allied ground forces advanced towards Mimoyecques, and on 30 July the Organisation Todt engineers were ordered to end construction work.

The Allies were unaware of this and mounted further attacks on the site as part of the United States Army Air Forces experimental Operation Aphrodite, involving radio-controlled B-24 Liberators packed with explosives. Two such attacks were mounted but failed; in the second such attack, on 12 August, Lt Joseph P. Kennedy, Jr. – the elder brother of future US President John F. Kennedy – was killed when the drone aircraft exploded prematurely. By the end of the bombing campaign, over 4,100 tons of bombs had been dropped on Mimoyecques, more than on any other V-weapons site.

The Mimoyecques site was never formally abandoned, but German forces left it at the start of September 1944 as the Allies advanced northeast from Normandy towards the Pas de Calais. It was captured on 5 September by the Canadian 3rd Infantry Division.

Subsequent investigations and attempted demolition

In September 1944, Duncan Sandys ordered the constitution of a Technical Inter-Services Mission under Colonel T.R.B. Sanders. It was given the task of investigating the V-weapons sites at Mimoyecques, Siracourt, Watten, and Wizernes, collectively known to the Allies as the "Heavy Crossbow" sites. Sanders' report was submitted to the War Cabinet on 19 March 1945.

Even at this stage the true purpose of the site was unclear. Claims that it had been intended to be used for "electro-magnetic projectors" (railguns), firing huge shells at London,  were debunked by Lord Cherwell, Winston Churchill's scientific adviser, who calculated that it would take sixty times the output of Battersea Power Station to fire a one-ton shell. Sanders' investigation brought to light the V-3 project for the first time, to the alarm of the British government. He concluded that although the site had been damaged it "could be completed or adapted for offensive action against this country at some future date, and [its] destruction is a matter of importance." Sandys brought the matter to the attention of Churchill and advised: "Since this installation constitutes a potential threat to London, it would be wise to ensure that it is demolished whilst our forces are still in France." Churchill later commented that the V-3 installation at Mimoyecques "might well have launched the most devastating attack of all on London."

The discovery of the site's true purpose produced some recriminations in London, as – unlike the V-1 and V-2 projects – the V-3 had not been uncovered by Allied intelligence  before the war's end. The British scientist and military intelligence expert Reginald Victor Jones later commented that "[intelligence] techniques that had been used against the flying bomb and the rocket appeared to have failed against HDP [V-3], and there had to be a reason. Basically it was that with our limited effort we had to concentrate on the most urgent problem, and thus on catching weapons not so much at the research stage (although we sometimes achieved this) as in the development stage – which usually meant when trials were showing promise." He concluded at the time, in April 1945, that the intelligence failure had not made much practical difference given the fact that the Germans had failed to develop the HDP into an effective weapon: "there was little warning; [but] there was little danger."

Following the recommendation that the site should be destroyed, the Royal Engineers stacked ten tons of British  bombs and captured German plastic explosive in the tunnels at Mimoyecques and detonated them on 9 May. This failed to achieve the desired effect, and on 14 May, a further 25 tons of explosives were used to bring down the north and south entrances to the railway tunnel into the site. A subsequent investigation by the British Bombing Research Mission concluded that the entrances had been heavily blocked and that it would be a very difficult and lengthy engineering task to reinstate them. The British action was taken without informing the French beforehand and infuriated Charles de Gaulle, who considered it a violation of France's national sovereignty.

Preservation
After the war, the Mimoyecques site lay abandoned. Much of the equipment left by the Germans was disposed of as scrap metal. A complete set of four steel plates, weighing 60 tons, that were intended to protect the entrances to the drifts were bought by the manager of the Hidrequent-Rixent quarries to be cut up for use in rock-crushing machinery. Rediscovered by local historians in the 1990s, they remained at the quarries until 2010, when the surviving plates were returned to Mimoyecques, where they are now on display.

Despite the closure of the railway tunnel entrances it was still possible for many years to get into the complex by climbing down one of the inclined drifts. In 1969, Marie-Madeleine Vasseur, a farmer from Landrethun, had the southern entrance excavated so that the tunnels could be used as a mushroom farm.  of the southern tunnel had to be removed to clear the blockage; the entrance now visible is not the original one built by the Germans. The southern entrance had been bricked up again by the 1970s. Moved to discover this forgotten construction, Vasseur, helped by family and friends, cleared the tunnels and installed an electricity supply. The société à responsabilité limitée "La Forteresse de Mimoyecques" was constituted in 1984 to operate the site as a museum under the name of Forteresse de Mimoyecques – Un Mémorial International.

The museum closed at the end of the 2008 season when the owner retired. Subsequently, the nonprofit organisation Conservatoire d'espaces naturels du Nord et Pas-de-Calais (Conservatory of natural sites of the Nord and Pas-de-Calais) purchased it at a cost of €330,000, with funding provided by the Nord-Pas-de-Calais regional council, the European Union and a private benefactor. The Conservatory's interest was due to the presence on the site of a large bat colony that included rare species, such as the Greater Horseshoe Bat, Geoffroy's Bat and the Pond Bat.

The intercommunality of the Terre des Deux Caps and the authorities in nearby Landrethun set up a partnership to operate the site under the management of the existing museum of La Coupole near Saint-Omer. The director of the latter, historian Yves le Maner, designed the contents of a new museum that was constructed at a cost of €360,000.

The site reopened to the public on 1 July 2010. As well as presenting a history of the V-weapons and of the site, the museum enables visitors to see some of the tunnels and a mock-up of the HDP gun. The tunnels also house memorials to Joseph Kennedy, the other bomber crew members killed during raids on the site, and the forced labourers who lost their lives during construction. In 2011, the museum had about 11,000 visitors, of whom 53% were French, 18% Belgian and 16% British.

See also
 Blockhaus d'Éperlecques
 La Coupole

Notes

References

Bibliography

Further reading

External links

 Fortress of Mimoyecques – museum website
  Une base pour bombarder Londres
  History of the HDP from Hillersleben to Buhl/Guebwiller
  Chroniques Historiques – Les tunnels de Mimoyecques: la Base V3
  Forteresse de Mimoyecques – Quand histoire et nature ne font qu'un

V-weapon subterranea
World War II in the Pas-de-Calais
Museums in Pas-de-Calais
World War II museums in France
Infrastructure completed in 1944
Buildings and structures in Pas-de-Calais
Ruins in Hauts-de-France
World War II sites in France